Telugu people, also called Telugus or Telugu vaaru, are an ethnolinguistic group who speak the Telugu language and are native to the Indian states of Andhra Pradesh, Telangana and the Yanam district of Puducherry. They are the largest of the four major Dravidian groups in terms of population. Telugus claim descent from the Andhras, from whom the Telugus inherit their ethnonym. Telugu is the fourth most spoken language in India and the 15th most spoken language in the world.

A significant number of Telugus also reside as linguistic minorities in the Indian states of Karnataka, Tamil Nadu, Odisha, Maharashtra, Chhattisgarh, and West Bengal as well in the union territory of Andaman and Nicobar Islands. Members of the Telugu diaspora are spread across countries like United States, Australia, Canada in the Anglosphere; Myanmar, Malaysia, South Africa, Mauritius; and the Arabian Gulf countries of UAE, Saudi Arabia, Kuwait etc.

Andhra was mentioned in the Sanskrit epics such as Aitareya Brahmana (by some estimates c. 800 BCE). According to Aitareya Brahmana of the Rigveda, the Andhras left North India from the banks of river Yamuna and migrated to South India. They are mentioned at the time of the death of the Mauryan King Ashoka in 232 BCE. This date has been considered to be the beginning of the Andhra historical record.

During the rise of Nastika Schools of Buddhism and Jainism in the region, Telugus, along with most of India, saw a reformation of their traditional high society. Mahayana Buddhism, which would later go on to become the largest Buddhist tradition in the world, developed among Telugus in Andhra. Telangani, a term referring to a Telugu or a resident in the land inhabited by Telugus came into common usage during the 14th century CE.

History

Andhra was a kingdom mentioned in the epic Mahabharata. It was a southern kingdom, currently identified as Indian state of Andhra Pradesh where it got its name from.

Andhra communities are also mentioned in the Vayu and Matsya Purana. In the Mahabharata the infantry of Satyaki was composed by a tribe called Andhras, known for their long hair, tall stature, sweet language, and mighty prowess. They lived along the banks of the Godavari river. Andhras and Kalingas supported the Kauravas during the Mahabharata war. Sahadeva defeated the kingdoms of Pandya, Andhra, Kalinga, Dravida, Odra and Chera while performing the Rajasuya yajna. Buddhist references to Andhras are also found.

Andhra was mentioned in the Sanskrit epics such as Aitareya Brahmana (by some estimates c. 800 BCE). According to Aitareya Brahmana of the Rigveda, the Andhras left North India from the banks of river Yamuna and migrated to South India. They are mentioned at the time of the death of the great Mauryan King Ashoka in 232 BCE. This date has been considered to be the beginning of the Andhra historical record. Various dynasties have ruled the area, including the Andhra (or Satavahana), Andhra Ikshvakus, Eastern Chalukyas, the Kakatiyas, the Vijayanagara Empire.

Telugu is a South-Central Dravidian language primarily spoken in the states of Andhra Pradesh and Telangana, India, where it is the official language. The oldest inscriptions with Telugu words date to 400 BCE found at Bhattiprolu in Guntur district. Other early inscriptions with more refined language were found in Kantamanenivarigudem, Guntupalli in West Godavari district and Gummadidurru and Ghantasala in Krishna district. The earliest inscription completely written in Telugu dates to 575 CE were found at Kalamalla village in Kadapa district. The earliest Telugu literature dates to 11th century CE with Nannaya's Andhra Mahabharatam.

In the sixth century BCE, Assaka was one of the Sixteen Mahajanapadas. After the Mauryas, parts of Andhra Pradesh, Telangana were variously ruled by dynasties either ethnically Telugus. It was succeeded by the Satavahana dynasty (230 BCE-220 CE), who built the city of Amaravati. The kingdom reached its zenith under Gautamiputra Satakarni. At the end of the period, the Telugu region was divided into Kingdoms ruled by lords. In the late second century CE, the Andhra Ikshvakus ruled the eastern region along the Krishna River. The Vishnukundina Dynasty, Eastern Chalukyas, Kakatiya Dynasty and Reddy dynasty were some of the many Major Telugu Kingdoms and Dynasties Ruling the Region.

During the fourth century, the Pallava dynasty extended their rule from southern Andhra Pradesh to Tamilakam and established their capital at Kanchipuram. Their power increased during the reigns of Mahendravarman I (571–630) and Narasimhavarman I (630–668). The Pallavas dominated the southern Telugu-speaking region and northern Tamilakam until the end of the ninth century.

Between 1163 and 1323 the Kakatiya dynasty emerged, bringing the Telugu region under unified rule. During this period, the Telugu language emerged as a literary medium with the writings of Tikkana, Eranna, Nannaya, Pothana etc., are the converters of the great Hindu epics like Ramayana, Mahabharatha, Bhagavatha etc.,.

In 1323 the sultan of Delhi, Ghiyath al-Din Tughluq, sent a large army commanded by Ulugh Khan (later, as Muhammad bin Tughluq, the Delhi sultan) to conquer the Telugu region and lay siege to Warangal. The fall of the Kakatiya dynasty led to an era with competing influences from the Turkic kingdoms of Delhi, the Chalukya Chola dynasty (1070–1279) in the south and the Persio-Tajik sultanate of central India. The struggle for Andhra ended with the victory of the Musunuri Nayaks over the Turkic Delhi Sultanate.

The Telugu achieved independence under Krishnadevaraya of the Vijayanagara Empire (1336–1646). The Qutb Shahi dynasty of the Bahmani Sultanate succeeded that empire. The Qutub Shahis were tolerant of Telugu culture from the early 16th to the end of the 17th centuries.

The arrival of Europeans (the French under the Marquis de Bussy-Castelnau and the English under Robert Clive) altered polity of the region . In 1765, Clive and the chief and council at Visakhapatnam obtained the Northern Circars from Mughal emperor Shah Alam. The British achieved supremacy when they defeated Maharaja Vijaya Rama Gajapati Raju of Vizianagaram in 1792.

Andhra's modern foundation was laid in the struggle for Indian independence under Mohandas Gandhi. Potti Sreeramulu's campaign for a state independent of the Madras Presidency and Tanguturi Prakasam Panthulu and Kandukuri Veeresalingam's social-reform movements led to the formation of Andhra State, with Kurnool its capital and freedom-fighter Pantullu its first chief minister. A democratic society, with two stable political parties and a modern economy, emerged under the Chief Ministership of N. T. Rama Rao.

India became independent from the United Kingdom in 1947. Although the Muslim Nizam of Hyderabad wanted to retain independence from India, he was forced to cede his kingdom to the Dominion of India in 1948 to form Hyderabad State. Andhra, the first Indian state formed primarily on a linguistic basis, was carved from the Madras Presidency in 1953. In 1956, Andhra State was merged with the Telugu-speaking portion of Hyderabad State to create the state of Andhra Pradesh. The Lok Sabha approved the formation of Telangana from ten districts of Andhra Pradesh on 18 February 2014.

Culture

Literature

Arts
Kuchipudi is a famous Classical Indian dance from Andhra Pradesh.
 Kuchipudi
 Vilasini Natyam
 Perini Sivatandavam
 Oggu Katha
 Burra Katha
 Andhra Natyam
 Telugu Cinema
 Kalankari - The art Kalamkari is pronounced as Kalankari (కలంకారి) in Andhra Pradesh

Clothing
 Masculine
 Uttareeyam (Uttariya) or Pai Pancha (Angvastram or veil)
 Pancha (Dhoti)
 Jubba (Kurta) The top portion
 Lungi (Casual dress)
 Feminine
 Langa voni (Half sari)
 Pattu pavada
 Cheera (sari)

Festivals

Important festivals celebrated by Telugu people include:
 Bhogi, Makara Sankranti, Kanuma in January. (The exact date may vary as per the Hindu calendar.)
 Maha Sivaratri in February/March. (The exact date may vary as per the Hindu calendar.)
 Ugadi or the Telugu New Year in March/April. (The exact date may vary as per the Hindu calendar.)
 Sri Rama Navami celebrated in March/April, 9 days after Ugadi. (The exact date may vary as per the Hindu calendar.)
 Bonalu celebrated in Ashada masam (July/August). (The exact date may vary as per the Hindu calendar.)
 Hanuman Jayanti in March/May/June. (The exact date may vary as per the Hindu calendar.)
 Vaikunta Ekadasi in December /January . (The exact date may vary as per Hindu calendar.)
 Varalakshmi Vratam in August. (The exact date may vary as per Hindu calendar.)
 Krishna Janmashtami in August. (The exact date may vary as per Hindu calendar.)
 Vinayaka Chaviti in August. (The exact date may vary as per the Hindu calendar.)
 Bathukamma celebrated for nine days during Durga Navratri.
 Dasara in September/October. (The exact date may vary as per the Hindu calendar.)
 Atla Tadde 3rd day in bright half of Ashviyuja month (falls in September/October in Gregorian calendar). However, the exact date may vary according to the Hindu calendar.
 Deepavali date may vary as per the Hindu calendar.)
 Nagula Chavithi is in October/November. (The exact date may vary as per the Hindu calendar.)
 Ramadan, Eid al-Adha, Eid al-Fitr, Muharram, Vesak Day, Easter, Thanksgiving and Christmas are among the minorities.

Population

Distribution

Telugu is the fourth most spoken language after Hindi, Bengali and Marathi in India. Andhra Pradesh and Telangana are the principal resident states for Telugu people.

Telugu people form the majority speakers in South India with over 75 million speakers in Andhra Pradesh and Telangana. This is followed by 3.7 million in Karnataka and 4.2 million in Tamil Nadu making them the second largest language groups in those neighbouring states.

In Tamil Nadu, Telugu people who migrated during the Vijayanagara period have spread across several northern districts and constitute a significant percentage of the population in Chennai city. In Karnataka, Telugu people are predominantly found in the border districts with majority in Bengaluru city.
		
In Maharashtra, the Telugu population is over 1.4 million, followed by 0.7 million in Orissa. Other states with significant populations include West Bengal, Chhattisgarh and Gujarat with 200,000, 150,000 and 100,000 respectively.

The overseas Telugu diaspora numbers more than 400,000 in the United States, with the highest concentration in Central New Jersey, Texas, and California.

There are around 300,000 Telugu people in Malaysia. Telugu people in Myanmar number over 200,000.

Notable Telugu people

See also
 Telugu states
 List of people from Andhra Pradesh
 List of people from Telangana
 Telugu development
 Telugu cuisine

References

External links
 

 
  

 
Ethnic groups in India
Telugu-language literature

Dravidian peoples
Ethnic groups in Kerala
Linguistic groups of the constitutionally recognised official languages of India